The Bentley Azure is a four-seater convertible grand tourer produced by British automobile manufacturer Bentley Motors. The first version debuted in 1995 on the Bentley Continental R platform and was made until 2003. After a three-year break, a completely new version debuted in 2006 and was produced until 2009. It was powered by a significantly updated engine and based on the newer Arnage platform.

First generation (1995–2003)

The name was taken from earlier Robert Jankel sportier 2-door conversions that evolved into the Continental R. The Azure debuted in March 1995 at the Geneva Motor Show on the platform of the Continental R model, which had been originally launched in 1991. Production only crept to a start, with a mere nine examples finished in the first year – in 1996, after full production had started, no less than 251 cars were finished. Pininfarina assisted in the two-year process of turning the Continental R into a full four-seater convertible, and also built the shell and soft-top at their factory in Italy, largely from parts sourced in the UK. Final assembly was then carried out at Crewe. A roll-bar was never considered, which necessitated extensive reinforcing of the chassis.

Power came from the company's stalwart 6.75-litre V8, featuring a single, intercooled Garrett turbocharger and rated in the region of  – Rolls-Royce and Bentley did not yet give official power numbers at the time of the Azure's introduction.

Owing to the limited space and workforce at Bentley's Crewe factory, the Azure's electrically powered convertible top made from thick fabric was designed and manufactured by Pininfarina, which significantly added to the vehicle's cost. New in 1995, the Azure was priced at £215,167 – £22,590 more than the Continental R on which it was based.

From 1999 until the end of production, the Azure was also available in "Mulliner" trim, which added special bespoke trim and additional equipment and allowed the buyer the option for further customisation during the build-process; pricing varied by car, as equipment could be significantly different from one to the next depending on customer requests.

Just like its Rolls-Royce counterpart, towards the end of its production, it also had a final edition, called "Final series performance", created from 2002 to 2003, only 62 were made. The Last RHD sold being Chassis no. CH01228 while the very last Azure was retained at the Crewe plant. 

*stated by Pininfarina production records
**From 2 varying documents, newer data used

Second generation (2006–2009)

Volkswagen purchased Bentley from Vickers in 1998 when the Azure had been in production for three years. Volkswagen executives decided to keep the then-current Azure in production until 2003, then introduce its successor at a later date. Production of the new Azure began for the 2006 model year.

The Arnage was designed for the BMW 4.4-litre engine. However, due to the takeover battle in 1998 between BMW and Volkswagen Group for ownership of Rolls-Royce and Bentley Motors, BMW had threatened to stop supply of their engines if Volkswagen Group won. While the threat was later withdrawn in conjunction with BMW acquiring the right to manufacture Rolls-Royce automobiles at a new location, it was clear that Volkswagen could not accept the business and reputation risks associated with having their rival as a long-term business partner. Furthermore, customers were uncertain about engine and part availability. Volkswagen was thus forced to significantly re-work the "original" 6.75-liter Rolls-Royce/Bentley V8 in 2001, including a switch from the old single-turbo system to a modern twin-turbocharger setup, reducing turbo-lag and increasing horsepower output. A new, 6-speed ZF 6HP-32 automatic transmission fed power to the rear wheels.

Azure T (2009)
The "T" is a higher performance version of the Azure. Styling changes include 8.5J x 20-inch five-spoke, two-piece alloy wheels with 255/40 ZR20 Pirelli P Zero tyres, 'Le Mans' lower front wing air vents, dark-tinted upper and lower grilles, 'jewel' fuel filler cap (made from billet aluminium) and wing mirror mountings finished in body colour. The exterior styling was inspired by the Bentley Mark VI.

Audio system includes large display audio head unit with Secure Digital (SD) memory card slot, iPod/USB/3.5 mm AUX interface; with optional 'Naim for Bentley' 10-speaker, 1,100W audio system. Electronic Stability Programme, Tire Pressure Monitoring System are now standard equipment.

The twin-turbocharged engine was now rated  and  torque.

The Azure T was unveiled at the 2008 LA Auto Show.

Successor 
The Azure had no immediate successor.  However, at the 2014 Los Angeles Auto Show, Bentley unveiled a concept car built on the Mulsanne platform that followed the same formula as the two generations of the Azure that proceeded it.  Bentley did not use the Azure name again with the concept, simply calling it the Grand Convertible.

The production version of the Grand Convertible was unveiled at the 2017 Dubai Motor Show. The production version was also based on the Mulsanne platform but is  shorter due to the elimination of rear doors. The production version retained the wooden deck as shown on the concept car and the deck is described to be the biggest piece of wood ever applied to a production car. Mulliner, Bentley's internal coachbuilder, was tasked with the production of the Grand Convertible which was limited to 19 units only.

References

Bibliography

External links

Azure (2006)
Flagship vehicles
Rear-wheel-drive vehicles
Convertibles
2000s cars
2010s cars
Cars introduced in 1995